Frunzensky (masculine), Frunzenskaya (feminine), or Frunzenskoye (neuter) may refer to:
Frunzensky District (disambiguation), name of several districts in the countries of the former Soviet Union
Frunzensky (rural locality) (Frunzenskaya, Frunzenskoye), name of several rural localities in Russia
Frunzenskaya (Moscow Metro), a station of the Moscow Metro, Moscow, Russia
Frunzenskaya (Saint Petersburg Metro), a station of the Saint Petersburg Metro, St. Petersburg, Russia
Frunzenskaya (Minsk Metro), a station on the Minsk Metro's Avtozavodskaya Line
Frunzenskoye, former name of the village of Pulgon, Kyrgyzstan

See also
 Frunze (disambiguation)